Strumaria barbarae is a species of plant native to Namibia and to Cape Province in South Africa.  Its natural habitat is rocky areas.

References

Flora of Namibia
Plants described in 1981
Flora of the Cape Provinces
barbarae
Least concern plants
Taxonomy articles created by Polbot